This is a list of Estonian television related events from 1961.

Events
 30 December – first number of the newspaper "Televisioon" was issued. The newspaper was in both, in Estonian- and in Russian-language.

Debuts

Television shows

Ending this year

Births

Deaths

See also
 1961 in Estonia

References

1960s in Estonian television